Özlem Tekin (born November 18, 1971) is a Turkish singer and occasional actress, primarily known for her music. Though she started out in the hard rock genre, her music has progressed to incorporate different styles such as house, punk, pop and Turkish folk music.



Life and career
Özlem Tekin was born in California, United States into a Turkish-American family. Her father Talat Tekin was a prominent Turkologist and an Altaicist at UC Berkeley.  The Tekins moved to Turkey when she was four years old. Özlem grew up in Ankara, where she studied classical western music at the Hacettepe University Music Conservatory in Ankara, specializing in the clarinet.

She started out as the vocalist in The Bad. The Bad was an underground rock band like most other rock bands and they would perform gigs at clubs, often playing covers of other popular bands. In 1993, she met Şebnem Ferah, who has now also become another recognized rock musician in Turkey, and became the keyboard player of the successful all-female rock band Volvox. Özlem occasionally performed as the lead singer as well.

While still in Volvox, she met Hakan Peker and they started working on her debut solo album in 1994. This album, Kime Ne (who cares?), was eventually released in December 1995 to widespread critical acclaim. The first single Aşk Herşeyi Affeder Mi? (Does love forgive everything?), written by Barlas Erinç shot to the top of the charts. Other hit tracks include Duvaksız Gelin (Bride without a veil) and Herkes Şanslı Doğmuyor (Not everyone is born lucky).

Then, Özlem Tekin left Hakan Peker's record label and went to İstanbul Plak which also had acquired other popular singers such as Tarkan. Her second album Öz was released in February 1998. This spawned Yol which became an enormous hit.

Laubali came out a year later to great acclaim.

Özlem started up her own TV show on Kanal D called Yaz Rüzgarı (Summer Wind) in 2000. This aired for 1 hour, 5 days a week and received high ratings. In 2003 she started acting in the TV series "Sil Baştan" (From the Beginning). This show aired for 2 years, also with high ratings.

In 2005, she starred in the stage musical "Mucizeler Komedisi" (The Comedy of Miracles). That same year, her new album "10987654321" was released, which presented a much harder sound than her previous efforts.

In 2006, she acted in the Cem Yılmaz movie "Hokkabaz" (The Trickster). In the same year, she also featured in the TV movie "Maçolar".

Her fans celebrated her tenth year in music by naming a forest after her: "Özlem Tekin-Bahar Ormanı (Özlem Tekin-Spring Forest)" by her fans.

In 2007, she had a role in another TV movie "Fesupanallah" as well as acting on stage with the famous Metin Serezli in a theater show named "Kim O". She also featured in duets with up and coming musicians during the year. (Ozturk's "Ben Uyurken," Badem's "Kalpsiz")

In 2008, she started a new TV programme at Kral TV, one of the most established national music channels in Turkey. The programme's name is "Hiperaktif" (hyperactive) after Özlem's character. Also in 2008 she featured with Turkish singer Mişa, in his song "Dost Kalamam".

In 2010, after a long break since her last album, she released her sixth studio album, "Bana Bi'şey Olmaz". One of the old tracks, "Sil Baştan", which she wrote for the TV series with the same name, is in this album. She also recorded "Sen Anla" which was written by her and vocalized, and used by a famous Turkish singer, Levent Yüksel, in his earlier album. One of the interesting things about new album is that she interpreted a famous Anatolian folk song "Hey Onbeşli" as "Aslan Yarim", in her own musical style. The first video clip from this album was "Yatağım Boş". After a while, second video clip "Kimse Bilmez" started to appear on TV channels. Third video clip "Sen Anla" was released and had a better popularity than the previous singles.

Discography

Kargalar
Released by Ateş Müzik (2013).

Track Listing

 Kargalar (Crows)
 Asker (Soldier)
 Kiyamet (Apocalypse)
 Ay (Moon)
 Sebepsiz Savaş (Causeless war)
 Dünyam (My World)
 Tarlalar (Fields)
 Kargalar Remix
 Dünyam Remix
 Asker Remix

Bana Bi'şey Olmaz (Nothing Would Happen to Me)
Released by Sony Music) (2010).

Track Listing

 Bana Bi'şey Olmaz
 Kimse Bilmez
 Yatağım Boş
 Şikayetim Var
 Sen Anla
 Yüzde Seksen
 Erkekliğime Ver
 Vur Beni
 Aslan Yarim
 Sil Baştan
 Kimse Bilmez (Acoustic)

109876543210
Released by İstanbul Plak (2005).

Track Listing

 Değmez
 Gezegen X
 Cinayet
 Belki
 Dene
 Kaf Dağı
 Aşk Yangın
 A) Şık
 Aşinayım Firara
 Adımı Söyle

Tek Başıma (All Alone)
Released by İstanbul Plak (2002)

Track Listing

 Kimbilir
 Dağları Deldim
 Hep Yek
 Oof
 Kırıldım
 Deli Gibi
 Onun İçin
 Aşka Dair
 İki Adım
 Daa

Laubali (Cavalier)
Released by İstanbul Plak, (1999).

Track Listing

 Laubali
 Vurma
 Biri Var
 Biberi Bol
 Bu Kalp
 Kumdan Kaleler
 Yazmamışlar
 Ve Olamadı Aşk
 Sorma
 Beni Yakan Aşkın
 Bir yaz Günü

Öz
Öz is the second album by Turkish singer Özlem Tekin. It was released on 15 December 1998 by publisher Istanbul Plak. The album has ten songs.

Track Listing

 "Bahar" (composition-lyrics: Barlas)
 "Öz" (composition-lyrics: Özlem Tekin)
 "Yol" (composition-lyrics: Özlem Tekin)
 "Saat" (composition-lyrics: Özlem Tekin)
 "Paparazzi" (composition-lyrics: Özlem Tekin)
 "Tarlalar" (composition-lyrics: Özlem Tekin)
 "Duvar" (composition-lyrics: Özlem Tekin)
 "Dünya" (composition-lyrics: Özlem Tekin)
 "Çok" (composition-lyrics: Özlem Tekin)
 ”Hiç" (composition-lyrics: Barlas)

Kime Ne (Who Cares)
Released by Peker Müzik (1995, December 15).

Track Listing

 Aşk Her Şeyi Affeder mi
 Sebepsiz Savaş
 Duvaksız Gelin
 Yar Bana Varmadı
 Kime Ne
 Herkes Şanslı Doğmuyor
 Niye Bana Bu Ceza
 Adresler Karıştı
 Var mı Yan Bakan
 Gel Bu Yaz

References

External links
 
  Özlem Tekin

1971 births
Living people
American people of Turkish descent
American emigrants to Turkey
Women punk rock singers
Turkish rock singers
Turkish singer-songwriters
21st-century Turkish singers
21st-century Turkish women singers